Charles F. "Rick" Taylor (born September 19, 1941) is a former American football coach and college athletics administrator. He was the most successful head coach Boston University history after his stint from 1977 to 1984. He compiled an overall record of 55–32–1, including four Yankee Conference championships in a five-year span. Taylor also led the Terriers to at least eight wins on four occasions. Taylor retired from football after the 1984 season but remained the school's athletic director for four more years.

Head coaching record

References

1941 births
Living people
Boston University Terriers athletic directors
Boston University Terriers football coaches
Cincinnati Bearcats athletic directors
Dartmouth Big Green football coaches
Gettysburg Bullets football players
Hofstra Pride football coaches
Lehigh Mountain Hawks football coaches
Montclair State Red Hawks football coaches
Montclair State University alumni
Northwestern Wildcats athletic directors
People from Camp Hill, Pennsylvania
Players of American football from Pennsylvania
Yankee Conference commissioners